The following is a list of episodes of the television series The Tonight Show Starring Johnny Carson which aired in 1969:

1969

January

February

March

April

May

June

July

August

September

October

November

December

References

Tonight Show Starring Johnny Carson, The
Tonight Show Starring Johnny Carson, The
The Tonight Show Starring Johnny Carson